was a Japanese professor of agriculture, and a pioneer of agricultural economics. Seiichi Tobata was awarded the 1968 Ramon Magsaysay Award for Public Service, for his contributions to modernization of Japanese agriculture. He was also awarded the Grand Cordon of the Order of the Rising Sun (1975) and the Order of Culture (1980).

See also
"The 1968 Ramon Magsaysay Award for Public Service – BIOGRAPHY of Seiichi Tobata" (Retrieved on February 10, 2008)

References

1899 births
1983 deaths
Japanese scientists
Japanese agricultural scientists
Ramon Magsaysay Award winners